The following is a list of awards and nominations received by Irish and American actress Saoirse Ronan.

Ronan came to international prominence in 2007 with her co-starring role in the Joe Wright period drama Atonement (2007), for which she received nominations for the Academy Award for Best Supporting Actress, the BAFTA Award for Best Actress in a Supporting Role, and the Golden Globe Award for Best Supporting Actress, making her the seventh-youngest actress to receive an Oscar nomination in this category. In 2015, Ronan starred in the romantic-drama film Brooklyn, for which she received nominations for the Academy Award for Best Actress in a Leading Role, the BAFTA Award for Best Actress in a Leading Role, the Golden Globe Award for Best Actress – Motion Picture Drama, and the Screen Actors Guild Award for Outstanding Performance by a Female Actor in a Leading Role. At age 21, she is the eight-youngest Best Actress nominee.

In 2017, Ronan was nominated yet again for the Academy Award for Best Actress, the BAFTA Award for Best Actress in a Leading Role, and the Screen Actors Guild Award for Outstanding Performance by a Female Actor in a Leading Role, while winning the Golden Globe Award for Best Actress – Motion Picture Musical or Comedy, for her role in Greta Gerwig's coming of age comedy Lady Bird. Two years later, yet again in 2019, Ronan was nominated yet again for the Academy Award for Best Actress, the BAFTA Award for Best Actress in a Leading Role, and Golden Globe Award for Best Actress – Motion Picture Drama, for her role as Josephine "Jo" March in Little Women. At 25 years and six months of age, Ronan is the second youngest person to accrue four Academy Award nominations, behind only American actress Jennifer Lawrence.

Major associations
Below is a table summary of the seven film performances of Ronan's that have been recognised by either the Academy Awards, British Academy Film Awards, Critics' Choice Movie Awards, Golden Globe Awards and Screen Actors Guild Awards. Of these five major awards associations, Ronan has won an award at the Critics' Choice (Best Young Performer for The Lovely Bones) and Golden Globes (Best Actress in a Motion Picture  Musical or Comedy for Lady Bird).

Academy Awards
The Academy Awards are a set of awards given by the Academy of Motion Picture Arts and Sciences annually for excellence of cinematic achievements.

British Academy Film Awards
The British Academy Film Award (BAFTA) is an annual award show presented by the British Academy of Film and Television Arts.

Golden Globe Awards
The Golden Globe Award is an accolade bestowed by the 93 members of the Hollywood Foreign Press Association (HFPA) recognizing excellence in film and television.

Screen Actors Guild Awards
The Screen Actors Guild Awards are organized by the SAG-AFTRA. First awarded in 1995, the awards aim to recognize excellent achievements in film and television.

Film critic awards

Other awards and nominations

AACTA International Awards

Australian Film Institute

Awards Circuit Community Awards

B-Movie Film Festival

British Independent Film Awards

Chlotrudis Awards

CinEuphoria Awards

Dorian Awards

Empire Awards

Evening Standard British Film Awards

Fangoria Chainsaw Awards

Gold Derby Awards

Golden Schmoes Awards

Gotham Independent Film Awards

Hollywood Film Awards

IGN Summer Movie Awards

Independent Spirit Awards

International Online Cinema Awards

Irish Film & Television Awards

Italian Online Movie Awards

Kerry Film Festival

MTV Movie & TV Awards

Online Film & Television Association

Palm Springs International Film Festival

Satellite Awards

Saturn Award

Santa Barbara International Film Festival

Scream Awards

Teen Choice Awards

Women's Image Network Awards

World Soundtrack Awards

Young Artist Award

Critics associations

Notes

References

External links
 

Ronan, Saoirse